The Division 2 season 1997/1998, organised by the LFP was won by AS Nancy and saw the promotions of AS Nancy, FC Lorient and FC Sochaux-Montbéliard, whereas CS Louhans-Cuiseaux, Sporting Toulon Var, FC Martigues and FC Mulhouse were relegated to National.

22 participating teams

 Amiens
 Beauvais
 Caen
 Gueugnon
 Laval
 Le Mans
 Lille
 Lorient
 Louhans-Cuiseaux
 Martigues
 Mulhouse
 Nancy
 Nice
 Nîmes
 Niort
 Red Star
 Saint-Étienne
 Sochaux
 Toulon
 Troyes
 Valence
 Wasquehal

League table

Recap
 Promoted to L1 : AS Nancy, FC Lorient, FC Sochaux-Montbéliard 
 Relegated to L2 : EA Guingamp, LB Châteauroux, AS Cannes
 Promoted to L2 : AC Ajaccio, CS Sedan Ardennes 
 Relegated to National : CS Louhans-Cuiseaux, Sporting Toulon Var, FC Martigues, FC Mulhouse

Results

Top goalscorers

External links
RSSSF archives of results

Ligue 2 seasons
French
2